This is a list of number one singles on the Billboard Brasil Hot 100 chart in 2014. Note that Billboard published a monthly chart. Since April 2014, the Brazilian Billboard began publishing on its Brazilian site, the weekly Hot 100, as it is, and has always been held at the site, and Billboard magazine in other countries as well as the American Billboard.

Chart history

See also
Billboard Brasil
List of number-one pop hits of 2013 (Brazil)
Crowley Broadcast Analysis

References

Brazil Hot 100
2014 Hot 100